Salix eleagnos the bitter willow, olive willow, hoary willow, rosemary willow, or elaeagnus willow, is a species of flowering plant in the family Salicaceae, native to central and southern Europe and south west Asia.

Like all willows, the species is dioecious. The specific epithet eleagnos is frequently spelt elaeagnos (Elaeagnus, silverberry or oleaster), though the original spelling has been accepted as a correct Greek form.

Salix eleagnos subsp. angustifolia has gained the Royal Horticultural Society's Award of Garden Merit.

References

eleagnos
Flora of Ukraine